Guido Marcello Mugnaini (born 12 November 1940) is a retired Italian professional road bicycle racer.

Major results

1964
Giro d'Italia:
Winner stage 8
7th place overall classification
1965
Giro d'Italia:
4th place overall classification
1966
Tour de France:
Winner stage 11
5th place overall classification
1967
Giro d'Italia:
Winner stage 21

References

External links 

Official Tour de France results for Guido Marcello Mugnaini

Italian male cyclists
1940 births
Living people
Italian Tour de France stage winners
Italian Giro d'Italia stage winners
Sportspeople from the Province of Arezzo
Tour de Suisse stage winners
Cyclists from Tuscany